Communauté d'agglomération de la Riviera Française is the communauté d'agglomération, an intercommunal structure, centred on the city of Menton. It is located in the Alpes-Maritimes department, in the Provence-Alpes-Côte d'Azur region, southeastern France. Created in 2002, its seat is in Menton. Its area is 660.1 km2. Its population was 73,890 in 2019, of which 30,525 in Menton proper.

Composition
The communauté d'agglomération consists of the following 15 communes:

Beausoleil
Breil-sur-Roya
La Brigue
Castellar
Castillon
Fontan
Gorbio
Menton
Moulinet
Roquebrune-Cap-Martin
Sainte-Agnès
Saorge
Sospel
Tende
La Turbie

References

Riviera Francaise
Riviera Francaise